Villarreal is a town in eastern Spain, in the province of Castellón.

Villarreal may also refer to:

Sports 
 Villarreal CF, a football club based in Villarreal, Castellón
 Villarreal CF B, the reserve team of Villarreal CF
 Villarreal CF C, the second reserve team of Villarreal CF

People 
 Brayan Villarreal (born 1988), Venezuelan Major League baseball player
 David Villarreal (born 1955), American serial killer
 Eugenio Torres Villarreal, a Mexican professional wrestler, television host and rapper
 Federico Villarreal (1850–1923), 19th-century Peruvian mathematician
 José Villarreal (athlete), Venezuelan paralympic athlete
 Jose Villarreal (soccer) (born 1993), American soccer player who plays for LA Galaxy in Major League Soccer
 José Félix Villarreal (born 1956), Mexican chess master
 José Antonio Villarreal (1924–2010), novelist
 José Luis Villarreal (born 1966), former Argentine footballer
 Javier Villarreal (born 1979), Argentine football player
 Óscar Villarreal (born 1981), Mexican Major League baseball player

Places 
 Villareal, Samar, a municipality in Samar province, the Philippines
 Legutiano, a municipality in Álava province, Spain, sometimes referred to as Villarreal de Álava
 Ciudad Real in Spain, before it was made a city in 1420

Others 
 Universidad Nacional Federico Villarreal, is a public university in Lima

See also 
 Vila Real (disambiguation), the equivalent term in Portuguese.